Big Brother Slovenija 2016 is the fourth main season of the Slovenian version of Big Brother, which is broadcast on Kanal A. This season launched on Friday 26 February 2016. The host of the show this season is Manja Plešnar. The prize will be €50,000. This season Big Brother house is located in Vevče, Ljubljana, Slovenia.

This Season was won by 39-year-old Mirela Lapanović.

Housemates

Nominations table 
The first housemate in each box was nominated for two points, and the second housemate was nominated for one point.

Notes

Total Nominations Received

References

External links 
 Official website

Slovenia
2016 Slovenian television seasons

sl:Big Brother Slovenija